FC RShVSM-Olympia Minsk (FK RShVSM-Alimpiya) was a Belarusian football club based in Minsk. It represented the Belarusian State University of Physical Training.

History
Throughout its history, the club was always associated with a number of sport universities and youth football schools based in Minsk.

It was founded in 1985 as SKIF. From 1985 until 1991, the team played in Belarusian SSR Top League. In 1990, it was renamed to SKIF-ShVSM.

In 1992, the team was renamed to SKIF-RShVSM and joined newly created Belarusian First League. In the middle of 1992–93 season, they were renamed to AFViS-RShVSM. After unsuccessful 1994–95 season the team relegated to Belarusian Second League and its name was shortened to AFViS and in 1996 changed back to AFViS-RShVSM. The last name change (to RShVSM-Olympia, 'Olympia' notes relation to the School of Olympic reserve) occurred before the team's last professional season in early 2000. Since 2001, the team only participated in youth tournaments.

Abbreviations
 SKIF stands for the Sports Club of Institute of Physical Culture (Sportivny Klub Instituta Fizkultury).
 RShVSM stands for the Republican School of the Supreme Sport Mastery (Respublikanskaya Shkola Vysshego Sportivnogo Masterstva).
 AFViS stands for the Academy of Physical Education and Sports (Akademia Fizicheskogo Vospitaniya i Sporta).

External links
 Profile at footballfacts.ru
 Profile at teams.by

Defunct football clubs in Belarus
Association football clubs established in 1985
1985 establishments in Belarus
2000 disestablishments in Belarus
Association football clubs disestablished in 2000